The annual MTV Video Music Awards Latinoamérica 2004 took place on October 21, 2004 in Miami at the Jackie Gleason Theater for the third time in a row.

Paulina Rubio was the first woman to host the awards.

Nominations
Winners in bold.

Artist of the Year
 Alejandro Sanz
 Café Tacuba
 Diego Torres
 Julieta Venegas
 La Oreja de Van Gogh

Video of the Year
 Alejandro Sanz — "No Es Lo Mismo"
 Babasónicos — "Putita"
 Café Tacuba — "Eres"
 Julieta Venegas — "Andar Conmigo"
 Molotov — "Hit Me"

Best Solo Artist
 Alejandro Sanz
 Álex Ubago
 Diego Torres
 Julieta Venegas
 Tiziano Ferro

Best Group or Duet
 Babasónicos
 Café Tacuba
 Cartel de Santa
 La Ley
 La Oreja de Van Gogh

Best Pop Artist
 Alejandro Sanz
 Álex Ubago
 Diego Torres
 Julieta Venegas
 Paulina Rubio

Best Rock Artist
 Babasónicos
 Bersuit Vergarabat
 Fobia
 La Ley
 Vicentico

Best Alternative Artist
 Café Tacuba
 Cartel de Santa
 Control Machete
 Kinky
 Miranda!

Best Independent Artist
 Capri
 Los Látigos
 Pornomotora
 Telefunka
 Tolidos
No public voting

Best Pop Artist — International
 Avril Lavigne
 Beyoncé
 Hilary Duff
 Joss Stone
 Nelly Furtado

Best Rock Artist — International
 Blink 182
 Evanescence
 Maroon 5
 No Doubt
 The Rasmus

Best Hip-Hop/R&B Artist — International
 50 Cent
 Beastie Boys
 The Black Eyed Peas
 Outkast
 Usher

Best New Artist — International
 Franz Ferdinand
 Joss Stone
 Maroon 5
 The Rasmus
 Yellowcard

Best Artist — Mexico
 Aleks Syntek
 Belinda
 Café Tacuba
 Cartel de Santa
 Julieta Venegas

Best New Artist — Mexico
 Belinda
 Kalimba
 La 5ª Estación *
 Lu
 María Barracuda
*La 5ª Estación originated in Spain but it's considered a Mexican band as they were launched there

Best Artist — Central
 Cabas
 La Ley
 Los Bunkers
 Lucybell
 TK

Best New Artist — Central
 Cementerio Club
 De Saloon
 Lulu Jam
 Pali
 Pornomotora

Best Artist — Argentina
 Babasónicos
 Bersuit Vergarabat
 Catupecu Machu
 Diego Torres
 Vicentico

Best New Artist — Argentina
 Airbag
 Callejeros
 Capri
 Gazpacho
 Leticia Brédice

Performances
 Diego Torres, La Ley and Julieta Venegas — "Yeah!" / "Hey Ya!" / "Hey Mama"
 The Black Eyed Peas — "Let's Get It Started"
 The Rasmus — "Guilty"
 Alex Ubago — "Aunque No Te Pueda Ver"
 Tiziano Ferro — "Tardes Negras"
 Juanes — "Nada Valgo Sin Tu Amor"
 Julieta Venegas and Cartel de Santa — "Lento"
 Lenny Kravitz — "Calling All Angels"
 Paulina Rubio, DJ Toy and Pitbull — "Dame Otro Tequila" / "Culo"
 Molotov — "Amateur" and "Gimme Tha Power"
 Beastie Boys — "Ch-Check It Out" and "Sabotage"

Appearances
 Bono — introduced the audience to the show
 Molotov — presented Best Solo Artist
 La Ley — introduced The Rasmus
 Belinda and Natalia Lafourcade — introduced Alex Ubago and Tiziano Ferro
 Adrián and Marcelo (from Babasónicos) and Pirry — introduced Juanes
 Xzibit, Silvina Luna, María Eugenia Ritó and Rocío Guirao Díaz — presented Best Hip-Hop/R&B Artist—International
 Benjamín Vicuña, Kalimba and Ana de la Reguera — introduced Julieta Venegas and Cartel de Santa
 Miguel Rodarte and Nicole Neumann — presented Best Rock Artist
 Shakira — introduced Lenny Kravitz
 Diego Torres — introduced Paulina Rubio and Pitbull
 Gastón Pauls and Florencia de la V — presented Best Artist—Argentina
 Leticia Brédice — introduced Molotov
 Lenny Kravitz — presented Artist of the Year

Memorable Moments
 Host Paulina Rubio showed her behind.

Latin American music
MTV Video Music Awards
2004 music awards
2004 in Florida